Matane is a former provincial electoral district in the Bas-Saint-Laurent and Gaspésie–Îles-de-la-Madeleine regions of Quebec, Canada, that elected members to the National Assembly of Quebec.

It was created for the 1890 election from parts of Rimouski.  Its final election was in 2008.  It disappeared in the 2012 election and its successor electoral districts were Matane-Matapédia and Gaspé.

Geography
It is located at the western end of the Gaspé Peninsula, along the southern shore of the Saint Lawrence River.

It consists of the municipalities of:
Baie-des-Sables
Cap-Chat
Grosses-Roches
La Martre
Les Méchins
Marsoui
Matane
Mont-Saint-Pierre
Rivière-à-Claude
Saint-Adelme
Saint-Jean-de-Cherbourg
Saint-Léandre
Saint-Maxime-du-Mont-Louis
Saint-René-de-Matane
Saint-Ulric
Sainte-Anne-des-Monts
Sainte-Félicité
Sainte-Madeleine-de-la-Rivière-Madeleine
Sainte-Paule

It also consists of the unorganized territories of:
Coulée-des-Adolphe
Mont-Albert
Rivière-Bonjour

Linguistic demographics
Francophone: 99.5%
Anglophone: 0.3%
Allophone: 0.1%

Members of the Legislative Assembly / National Assembly

Electoral results

References

External links
Information
 Elections Quebec

Election results
 Election results (National Assembly)
 Election results (Elections Quebec)

Maps
 2001 map (Flash)
2001–2011 changes (Flash)
1992–2001 changes (Flash)
 Electoral map of Bas-Saint-Laurent region (as of 2001)
 Electoral map of Gaspésie–Îles-de-la-Madeleine region (as of 2001)
 Quebec electoral map, 2001

Matane
Former provincial electoral districts of Quebec